Nimrodel may refer to:
Nimrodel (river), in J. R. R. Tolkien's legendarium
"Nimrodel", a song on the 1974 album Mirage (1974) by English progressive rock band Camel